Fie or FIE may refer to:

People
Fie Hækkerup (born 1994), Danish politician
Fie Woller (born 1992), a Danish handball player for SG BBM Bietigheim and the Danish national team

Places
Fie, Norway or Fidje, a village in the municipality of Risør in Norway
Cape Fie, a cape marking the southeast extremity of Bouvetøya in the South Atlantic Ocean
 Fair Isle Airport (IATA airport code FIE), Fair Isle, Shetland, Scotland, UK

Groups, companies, organizations
Fédération Internationale d'Escrime, an international fencing body
FIE Foundation, a charity trust established in 1970
Fie! Records, a record label
FlyOne Armenia (ICAO airline code FIE)

Other uses
Fyer language (ISO 639 language code fie)
Fie (grape), a French wine grape
FIE Standard, a program by Reuven Feuerstein (Feuerstein's Instrumental Enrichment)
FIE3 (ftz instability element 3') element, an RNA element found in the 3' UTR of the fushi tarazu mRNA

See also

FEI (disambiguation)
Fi
Fle
F1e